Dacarbazine (DTIC), also known as imidazole carboxamide, is a chemotherapy medication used in the treatment of melanoma and Hodgkin's lymphoma. For Hodgkin's it is often used together with vinblastine, bleomycin, and doxorubicin. It is given by injection into a vein.

Common side effects include loss of appetite, vomiting, low white blood cell count, and low platelets. Other serious side effects include liver problems and allergic reactions. It is unclear if use in pregnancy is safe for the baby. Dacarbazine is in the alkylating agent and purine analog families of medication.

Dacarbazine was approved for medical use in the United States in 1975. It is on the World Health Organization's List of Essential Medicines.

Medical uses
As of mid-2006, dacarbazine is commonly used as a single agent in the treatment of metastatic melanoma, and as part of the ABVD chemotherapy regimen to treat Hodgkin's lymphoma, and in the MAID regimen for sarcoma. Dacarbazine was proven to be just as efficacious as procarbazine, another drug with similar chemistry, in the German trial for paediatric Hodgkin's lymphoma, without the teratogenic effects. Thus COPDAC has replaced the former COPP regime in children for TG2 & 3 following OEPA.

Side effects
Like many chemotherapy drugs, dacarbazine may have numerous serious side effects, because it interferes with normal cell growth as well as cancer cell growth.  Among the most serious possible side effects are birth defects to children conceived or carried during treatment; sterility, possibly permanent; or immune suppression (reduced ability to fight infection or disease). Dacarbazine is considered to be highly emetogenic, and most patients will be pre-medicated with dexamethasone and antiemetic drugs like 5-HT3 antagonist (e.g., ondansetron) and/or NK1 receptor antagonist (e.g., aprepitant). Other significant side effects include headache, fatigue and occasionally diarrhea.

The Swedish National Board of Health and Welfare has sent out a black box warning and suggests avoiding dacarbazine due to liver problems.

Mechanism of action
Dacarbazine works by methylating guanine at the O-6 and N-7 positions. Guanine is one of the four nucleotides that makes up DNA. The methylated DNA strands stick together such that cell division becomes impossible. This affects cancer cells more than healthy cells because cancer cells divide faster. Unfortunately however, some of the healthy cells will still be damaged.

Dacarbazine is bioactivated in liver by demethylation to "MTIC" and then to diazomethane, which is an alkylating agent.

Synthesis

History

Dacarbazine was developed by Y. Fulmer Shealy, PhD at Southern Research Institute in Birmingham, Alabama. Research was funded by a U.S. federal grant. Dacarbazine gained FDA approval in May 1975 as DTIC-Dome. The drug was initially marketed by Bayer.

Suppliers
Bayer continues to supply DTIC-Dome. There are also generic versions of dacarbazine available from APP, Bedford, Mayne Pharma (now Hospira) and Teva.

References

Further reading
OncoLink,

External links 
 

Hepatotoxins
Imidazoles
DNA replication inhibitors
IARC Group 2B carcinogens
Carboxamides
Teratogens
World Health Organization essential medicines
Cancer treatments
Wikipedia medicine articles ready to translate